La Croisière (or The Cruise) is a 2011 French comedy film directed by Pascale Pouzadoux.

Plot
Several characters have their destinies intersect on a cruise ship. Raphael follows his wife who left with her lover, stows away and dresses up as a woman. Simone is an old lady accustomed to carrying her dog in her handbag. A breeder of pigs is in search of her husband who never returned from the toilet.
There is also a young pickpocket, Chloe, and Alix, who is very stressed, sent on this cruise by being tricked into believing she had a business appointment. All will meet by chance, an unforgettable experience where everyone will manage to solve their problems and find happiness.

Cast

 Charlotte de Turckheim as Hortense
 Line Renaud as Simone
 Marilou Berry as Alix Sainte-Beuve
 Antoine Duléry as Raphie
 Nora Arnezeder as Chloé
 Armelle as Marie-Do
 Stéphane Debac as Diego
 Audrey Lamy as Samantha
 Alex Lutz as Brian
 Jean Benguigui as The commander
 Nicolas Vaude as The chaplain
 Hubert Saint-Macary as The doctor
 Franck Beckmann as Pierrick Lebouillonec
 Camille Japy as Camille
 Alexandre Brasseur as Camille's lover
 Marilou Lopes-Benites as Marie
 Laurence Badie as Odette
 Jacques Ciron as Raymond
 Eric Fraticelli as Tonio
 Guillaume Rumiel Braun as Frankie
 Michel Duléry as Jean-Pierre
 Arnaud Tsamere, Pauline Delpech, Alice Pol & Hugo Becker as Alix's collaborator

References

External links

2011 films
2011 comedy films
French comedy films
2010s French-language films
Films set on ships
Films directed by Pascale Pouzadoux
2010s French films